Acacia ommatosperma is a shrub of the genus Acacia and the subgenus Plurinerves that is endemic to an area of north western Australia.

Description
The shrub or small tree has weeping branches with glabrous angular branchlets. Like most species of Acacia it has phyllodes rather than true leaves. When it blooms it produces simple inflorescences that occur singly or in pairs in the axils with sperical flower-heads containing 25 to 30 yellow flowers. The thinly leathery and glabrous seed pods that form after flowering have a linear shape but are raised over and constricted between the seeds.

Taxonomy
The species was first formally described by the botanist Leslie Pedley in 1987 as Racosperma ommatospermum. It was transferred to genus Acacia in 1990 as Acacia ommatosperma.

Distribution
The shrub has a limited range in far north Queensland on the Cape York Peninsula around Weipa where it grows in gravelly ironstone soils.

See also
List of Acacia species

References

ommatosperma
Flora of Queensland
Taxa named by Leslie Pedley
Plants described in 1990